{{DISPLAYTITLE:C22H29ClO5}}
The molecular formula C22H29ClO5 may refer to:

 Alclometasone, a synthetic corticosteroid for topical dermatologic use
 Icometasone, a synthetic glucocorticoid corticosteroid which was never marketed